The Stella Maris Church is the name given to a religious building linked to the Catholic Church is located at 3 Duke of Clarence Street, in the town of Saint George of the British overseas territory of Bermuda in the North Atlantic Ocean.

The church began as a chapel in 1947 and was inaugurated and blessed in February 1948, follows the Roman or Latin Rite and is in the jurisdiction of the Diocese of Hamilton in Bermuda (Dioecesis Hamiltonensis in Bermuda), and was raised to its current status by Pope Paul VI in 1967 by the papal bull "Sanctissimae Christi".

As its name implies, the church is dedicated to the Virgin Mary in her title Stella Maris, or 'Star of the Sea.' In 2000 it was declared a center of Marian veneration of the diocese.

See also
Roman Catholicism in the United Kingdom

References

Roman Catholic churches in Bermuda
Buildings and structures in Bermuda
Roman Catholic churches completed in 1948
Stella Maris
20th-century Roman Catholic church buildings in the United Kingdom